A list of notable printing people from and working in Poland:

A

Izaak Aaronowicz
Jan Franciszek Adametz
Alfred Altenberg
Wacław Anczyc
Łazarz Andrysowicz
Aleksander Augezdecky

B
Karol Bahrke
Jan Nepomucen de Bobrowicz

C
Mirosław Chojecki

G
Jan Grodek

H
Jan Haller

K
Marcin Kasprzak

L
Jarosław Leitgeber

M
Hieronim Malecki

O
Samuel Orgelbrand

S
Jan Seklucjan
Walenty Stefański
Kasper Straube

U

Florian Ungler

W
Hieronim Wietor
Maciej Wirzbięta

Printers